Clarence Grier (born 1960s) is an American former basketball player who was selected by the Houston Rockets in the 1987 NBA draft, although he never ended up playing in the National Basketball Association. He is known for his collegiate career at Campbell University between 1985 and 1987. Grier was the holder of 30 school records at the time of his graduation and was named the Big South Conference Player of the Year as a senior in 1986–87.

Grier played the forward position and is 6'7". The year he was named the Big South's top player, Grier scored a school single season-record 739 points behind a 24.6 points per game average, which ranked 12th nationally. He finished his two-year career with 1,087 points.

After a stint playing for the Continental Basketball Association's Quad City Thunder, Grier retired from basketball and became a Certified Public Accountant in the city of High Point, North Carolina. In 2001, he was inducted into the Campbell University Hall of Fame.

References

1960s births
Living people
American men's basketball players
Basketball players from Greensboro, North Carolina
Campbell Fighting Camels basketball players
Forwards (basketball)
Houston Rockets draft picks
Junior college men's basketball players in the United States
Quad City Thunder players